Kumiko is a feminine Japanese given name.

Kumiko may also refer to:

 4454 Kumiko, main-belt Asteroid
 Kumikō, an incense-comparing game and aspect of kōdō
 Kumiko (woodworking), the pieces of lattice work in traditional Japanese architecture
 Kumiko, the Treasure Hunter, a 2014 American drama film